Violent Machine is the seventh studio album by guitarist Tony MacAlpine, released in 1996 through Metropolis Records (North America) and in 1997 through Victor Entertainment (Japan); it was reissued on May 7, 2002 through Lion Music, with the latter featuring different cover art and having apparently been released without the authorization of MacAlpine or Metropolis.

Track listing

Personnel
Tony MacAlpine – guitar, keyboard, mixing, production
Jerome Jones – vocals ("Hatred to Love")
Mike Terrana – drums
Kevin Chown – bass
Damir Simic Shime – engineering, mixing
Bob Fisher – mastering

Note: Although the back of the CD tray inlay for the 1996 Metropolis edition shows/lists Ricky Ricardo on bass, the liner notes in the cover booklet state: "All Bass Tracks Performed by Kevin Chown." The 2002 Lion edition correctly lists and shows Kevin Chown on bass, as does the back of the CD tray inlay.

References

External links
Tony MacAlpine "Violent Machine" at Guitar Nine Records (archived)

Tony MacAlpine albums
1996 albums
Metropolis Records albums